The 2022 Emir of Qatar Cup was the 50th edition of the Qatari cup tournament in men's football. It was played by the first and second level divisions of the Qatari football league structure.

Round of 16

Quarter-finals

Semi-finals

Final

Top goalscorers

References

External links
Amir Cup, Qatar Football Association

Football cup competitions in Qatar
Qatar
2021–22 in Qatari football